Kalifa Coulibaly (born 21 August 1991) is a Malian professional footballer who plays as a forward for the Mali national team.

Club career
Born in Bamako, Coulibaly played club football for Real Bamako, Paris Saint-Germain B and Sporting Charleroi before signing a four-year deal with Gent in June 2015.

On 18 August 2017, FC Nantes announced the signing of Coulibaly on a five-year deal.

On 29 August 2022, Coulibaly signed with Red Star Belgrade in Serbia until the end of the season, with an option to extend.

International career
Coulibaly made his international debut for the Mali national team in 2013. He was a member of the squad at the 2017 Africa Cup of Nations.

Career statistics

International

Scores and results list Mali's goal tally first, score column indicates score after each Coulibaly goal.

Honours
Real Bamako
Malian Cup: 2010

Nantes
Coupe de France: 2021–22

References

External links

1991 births
Living people
Sportspeople from Bamako
Association football forwards
Malian footballers
Mali international footballers
AS Real Bamako players
Paris Saint-Germain F.C. players
R. Charleroi S.C. players
K.A.A. Gent players
FC Nantes players
Red Star Belgrade footballers
Malian Première Division players
Championnat National 2 players
Belgian Pro League players
Ligue 1 players
Malian expatriate footballers
Malian expatriate sportspeople in France
Expatriate footballers in France
Malian expatriate sportspeople in Belgium
Expatriate footballers in Belgium
Malian expatriate sportspeople in Serbia
Expatriate footballers in Serbia
2017 Africa Cup of Nations players
2019 Africa Cup of Nations players
21st-century Malian people
2021 Africa Cup of Nations players
Serbian SuperLiga players